The (International) Noise Conspiracy (abbreviated T(I)NC) were a Swedish rock band formed in Sweden in the late months of 1998. The line-up consists of Dennis Lyxzén (vocals), Inge Johansson (bass), Lars Strömberg (guitar), and Ludwig Dahlberg (drums). The band is known for its punk and garage rock musical influences, and its impassioned left-wing political stance. Up until 2004, guitarist/organist/keyboardist Sara Almgren was also a member of the band. Dennis formed The (I)NC almost immediately after the breakup of his former band, Refused. The (I)nc takes pride in blending the roots of at least four other bands, including Totalt Jävla Mörker (Johansson), Separation (Strömberg), Saidiwas (Dahlberg and Almgren), and Doughnuts (Almgren). In 2007, Inge Johansson also played in the band The Most.

Influenced by a quote from 1960s folk singer Phil Ochs, according to lead singer Lyxzén, the band wanted to achieve an ideal blend of music and politics that was, "a cross between Elvis Presley and Che Guevara."  Furthermore, according to the liner notes of their debut album, The First Conspiracy, the band wanted to combat music's function as Spectacle. This is a concept taken from Guy Debord's work The Society of the Spectacle.

History

First recordings 
In 1999 the band recorded their debut The First Conspiracy with G7 Welcoming Committee Records. Although hardly a commercial success, the album led to the band's recognition by the punk label Burning Heart Records (though the same label already had released records of some of the band members' older bands), and in 2000 they released the album Survival Sickness. Considered one of the finest examples of situationist-influenced punk rock, Survival Sickness saw the band pushing their revolutionary ideology with scathing lyrics and an infectious rhythm. Many of the lyrics are taken directly from the writings of members of the Situationist International especially Raoul Vaneigem's The Revolution of Everyday Life.

By 2001, the band had re-entered the Burning Heart studio to record their next album, A New Morning, Changing Weather. Taking advantage of Almgren's organ playing, The (International) Noise Conspiracy produced a record far beyond the realm of most punk groups. Using organs, horns, keys, etc., the band began to establish a reputation for eclectic instrumentation, which they would continue to cultivate.

Touring 

The band's first tour outside Sweden, their homeland, went to China. They played their songs in illegal and hidden rock clubs while the Chinese police waited outside with guns and nightsticks. They also toured with My Chemical Romance in the United States. The band's lead singer describes their music as like The Hives with added politics, as The (International) Noise Conspiracy have a strong Situationist agenda in some of their work, such as 'Capitalism Stole My Virginity'.

Later recordings 
Between 2002 and 2003, the Up For Sale EP (Sympathy for the Record Industry) and Bigger Cages, Longer Chains EP (2003, Burning Heart/Epitaph Records) were recorded and the 16 March 2002 show in Bremen, Germany recorded and released by Tobby Holzinger (Your Choice Records) as Your Choice Live Series Vol.25.

In 2004 The (International) Noise Conspiracy teamed up with famed producer Rick Rubin on what would become their next album. Swedish jazz saxophone player Jonas Kullhammar temporarily joined the band on sax and keyboards and also co-wrote the songs. Organists Billy Preston and Benmont Tench also temporarily joined the lineup, as Sara Almgren left the band in order to play for the Swedish punk band, The Vicious (later Masshysteri). Rick Rubin signed the band on to his label American Recordings. In the end, the band released Armed Love in 2004. The inlay of the album pays tribute to the slogan: "¡O Bailan todos, o no baila nadie!" as written by Tupamaros. The saying translates to: "Either Everyone Dances, or No One Dances!" According to The (International) Noise Conspiracy, they try to define their idea and music with this phrase.

In 2006 the (International) Noise Conspiracy contributed a cover of "Shut Up" to The Monks tribute album Silver Monk Time: A Tribute to The Monks, which was released in October.

In 2007 the band completed the recording of a new album. In an interview for Rockstar.tv on 28 August, the band said they were planning on naming their new album "The Cross of My Calling" and it would contain "mystical" lyrics with a more soulful sound, which will make its release on 17 November 2008, in Europe, and 25 November, in America. The fourteen-track album was recorded with producer Rick Rubin through Burning Heart, American and Vagrant Records.

Members 
Sara Almgren — rhythm guitar, keyboards, organ (1998–2004)
Ludwig Dahlberg — drums, percussion (1998–2009)
Inge Johansson — bass, backing vocals (1998–2009)
Dennis Lyxzén — lead vocals, tambourine (1998–2009)
Lars Strömberg — guitar, backing vocals (1998–2009)

Discography

Studio albums
The First Conspiracy (1999, G7 Welcoming Committee Records)
Survival Sickness (2000, Burning Heart/Epitaph)
 A New Morning, Changing Weather (2001, Burning Heart/Epitaph)
 Armed Love (2004, Burning Heart/American Recordings)
 The Cross of My Calling (2008, Burning Heart/Vagrant/American Recordings)

Live albums
 Your Choice Live Series 025 (2002, Your Choice Records)
 Live at Oslo Jazz Festival (2003, Moserobie Music Production)
 (Live EP) (2005, American Recordings)

EPs and Singles
 The First Conspiracy 7" (1999, Premonition Records)
 Abolish Work 7" (1999, The Black Mask Collective)
 T.I.M.E.B.O.M.B. 7" (1999, Carcrash Records)
 The Subversive Sound of the Conspiracy 7" (1999, Trans Solar Records)
 Smash It Up EP (2000, Big Wheel Recreation)
 The Reproduction of Death EP (2001, Sub Pop Records)
 Capitalism Stole My Virginity EP (2001, G7 Welcoming Committee Records)
 Up For Sale EP (2002, Sympathy for the Record Industry)
 Bigger Cages, Longer Chains EP (2003, Burning Heart Records/Epitaph Records)
 Black Mask EP (2004, Burning Heart Records) (#92 UK)
 A Small Demand EP (2004, Burning Heart Records)

Compilations/Other
 The First Conspiracy (1999, G7 Welcoming Committee)
 Separation / T(I)NC (1999 split with Separation, The Black Mask Collective, Busted Heads Records)
 Take Penacilin Now (2005 compilation, G7 Welcoming Committee Records)
 Rock Against Bush Vol. 2 (2004 compilation, Fat Wreck Chords)
 Silver Monk Time: A Tribute to the Monks (2006 compilation, Play Loud!)
 Punk-o-Rama (vol. 7) (2001)

Videography
 "Smash It Up"
 "The Reproduction of Death"
 "Capitalism Stole My Virginity"
 "Up For Sale"
 "Black Mask"
 "A Small Demand"

See also
Invasionen, Dennis Lyxzén's solo project
Refused, Dennis Lyxzén's former band

References

External links

 
 
 Live Pictures of TINC from 07.12.2008 in Switzerland from Poorboys on The Road
 Live Pictures Of T(I)NC
 Interview and live-videos at wenn's rockt! WebTV
 Record Label
 Your Choice Records - Official site
 Dennis and Inges' record label Ny Våg
 Lars and Ludwig talk about their favorite songs
The (International) Noise Conspiracy's New Track "Arm Yourself"

Epitaph Records artists
G7 Welcoming Committee Records artists
Garage punk groups
Refused
Swedish communists
Swedish indie rock groups
Swedish punk rock groups
Sympathy for the Record Industry artists
Burning Heart Records artists
Political music groups
English-language singers from Sweden
1998 establishments in Sweden